A prime is a natural number that has exactly two distinct natural number divisors: 1 and itself.

Prime or PRIME may also refer to:

Arts, entertainment, and media

Fictional characters 
 Prime (comics), a comic book character
 Dyson Aliens or The Primes, aliens in Peter Hamilton's Commonwealth Saga

Music
 Prime (music)
 Prime Boys, Canadian hip hop collective
 Prime (percussion), to lightly strike an instrument such as a gong in preparation for playing
 Prime form (music)
 Unison, an interval also called a prime

Television channels 
 Prime (Canadian TV channel) or DTour
 Prime (Moldovan TV channel)
 Prime (New Zealand TV channel)
 Prime TV (Sri Lanka)
 AFN Prime, part of the American Forces Network
 BBC Prime, a television channel in Europe and the Middle East
 Prime Media Group, an Australian media corporation
 Prime Network, a defunct cable sports network in the United States
 Prime Televisie, a Flemish pay television channel
 Prime7, a television network in Australia owned by Prime Media
 Prime (Hungary), a sister channel to TV2

Other uses in arts, entertainment, and media
 Prime (film), a 2005 romantic comedy
 Prime lens, a lens which has a fixed focal length, in film and photography
 Prime Number (short story collection), a short story collection by Harry Harrison
 Prime time, a block of slots each evening in broadcast programming
 Prime version, the original version of an artwork existing in several versions

Brands and enterprises
 Amazon Prime, a subscription service of Amazon.com
 Prime (drink), a brand of beverages
 Prime Books, an American publisher

Finance
 Prime (finance)
 Prime rate, a rate of interest applied in banking

Mathematics 
 Prime (order theory)
 Prime 3-manifold, a 3-manifold that cannot be written as the connect sum of two nontrivial 3-manifolds
 Prime element, in algebra
 Prime form of a Riemann surface
 Prime ideal, a subset of a ring
 Prime knot, a knot that cannot be written as the knot sum of two non-trivial knots in knot theory
 Prime model, as simple a model as possible in model theory
 Prime polynomial

People
 Prime (graffiti artist) (born 1971) or Jose Reza
 Prime (surname)

Science and technology
 PRIME (power-line communication), a power-line communication standard
 PRIME (labeling technique), probe incorporation mediated by enzymes, a molecular biology research tool
 Prime editing, a gene editing technique
 PRIME, a GPU offloading solution for the Linux kernel, used in the Direct Rendering Manager
 HP Prime, a graphing calculator model
 Prime Computer, a producer of minicomputers

Sports
 Prime F.C., a Nigerian football club
 Prime parry, a parry form in fencing
 Prime (cycling), an intermediate sprint within a bicycle race

Vehicles
 Edel Prime Bi, a South Korean paraglider design
 Prius Prime, an automobile
 USS Prime (AM-279), a minesweeper in naval service 1944–46
 USS Prime (AM-466), a minesweeper commissioned in 1954
 X-23 PRIME, an experimental re-entry vehicle

Other uses
 Prime (liturgy), a canonical hour
 Prime (symbol), the ′ mark, typically used as a suffix
 Prime, a grading of meat in beef carcass classification
 Prime rib, or standing rib roast, a cut of beef from the primal rib, one of the primal cuts of beef
 Programme for Rebuilding and Improving Existing Schools, a programme of the Singapore Ministry of Education
 Prime years, the ideal or perfect age

See also
 E-Prime, a modified English syntax and vocabulary lacking all forms of "to be"
 Priam (disambiguation)
 Prima (disambiguation)
 Primal (disambiguation)
 Primer (disambiguation)
 Priming
 Primus (disambiguation)
 Primary color (Red/blue/yellow, red/green/blue or cyan/magenta/yellow, depending on mechanism)